Anadia brevifrontalis, the shorthead anadia, is a species of lizard in the family Gymnophthalmidae. It is endemic to Venezuela where it occurs in the Andes of the Mérida state.

References

Anadia (genus)
Reptiles of Venezuela
Endemic fauna of Venezuela
Reptiles described in 1903
Taxa named by George Albert Boulenger